Gainsborough is a village in the Canadian province of Saskatchewan within the Rural Municipality of Argyle No. 1 and Census Division No. 1. A farming community, the village is located on Highway 18 in the southeastern corner of Saskatchewan. The first post office was established on April 1, 1884 as the community of Antler. On September 1, 1885 the name of the community changed to Gainsborough, after Gainsborough, Lincolnshire in England, which was the former home of J. J. Sadler, an early settler.

Location
8 miles east is the community of Pierson, Manitoba. To the west 8 miles is the village of Carievale. 16 miles straight north of Gainsborough is the hamlet of Fertile. The closest communities to the south are Antler and Sherwood, North Dakota. Nearby towns to the north and west are Storthoaks, Carnduff, Glen Ewen, Oxbow, and Bellegarde, while to the east are Lyleton, Tilston and Melita, Manitoba. The nearest population centres with more than 10,000 people are approximately an hour's drive away: Estevan, which is westward on Highway 18, and Minot, North Dakota is a 75-minute drive almost directly south. Brandon is a 2-hour drive away, while Regina, Saskatchewan and Winnipeg are each approximately 3.0-3.5 hours away by car.

Antler is the closest border crossing station between Canada and the US, and like most small posts on the frontier it is closed overnight. Gainsborough is approximately equidistant to two 24-hour border crossings: North Portal, Saskatchewan 90 km to the west, and Boissevain, Manitoba 120 km to the east.

History
Gainsborough incorporated as a village on May 25, 1894. 

The Gainsborough Creek forms most of the southern boundary of the town, while the rest of the community is bordered by open fields and pasture. A tributary of the Souris River, the creek is prone to flooding during the spring thaw. Though several nearby communities made national headlines as disaster areas during severe flooding in 2011, most buildings in Gainsborough did not require unusual extraordinary protection measures or sandbagging. In 2014, extended heavy rainfall in the region resulted in severe flash flooding that forced the complete evacuation of residents to neighbouring communities and made national headlines.  Provincial premier Brad Wall did an aerial survey of the flood area that allowed images and video of the flooded village to be recorded near the maximum height of the waters.

Demographics 

Economy
Saskatchewan is in the CST Zone, and since 1967 it has not observed daylight saving time meaning that local clocks do not get changed in summer. A practical effect on border towns like Gainsborough is that they only align with neighbouring communities in Manitoba and North Dakota for half the year, which may lead to misunderstandings regarding the timing of scheduled inter-community events.

Primary income of community members is derived from agricultural businesses (farming, ranching) and petroleum drilling services.

Places of interest
Bennet Park - located on Railway Avenue (main street), formerly the location of a pool hall, hardware store, and mechanic
Bowens Park - central to the southern half of the town along Antler Avenue
Memorial Cenotaph - located adjacent to the theatre on Bruce Street
Churches - two (Knox United, Anglican). The Anglican Christ Church is registered on the List of historic places in Saskatchewan
Community hall - basement with kitchen, main hall has a stage and upper meeting room
Gainsborough Agricultural Grounds - kitchen facilities, three baseball diamonds, racetrack located north of the curling rink.
Campground facilities are located north of the Health Centre adjacent to the sports fields.
There is a privately owned museum with articles from the town's history that is opened by request.

Amenities, associations, and clubs
 Lions Clubs International
 Gainsborough Library
 Gainsborough Curling Club
 There is a small grass airstrip located in the north end of the town listed as the Gainsborough Airport.

Notable people
 Dr William G. Hobbs, a former physician in the Gainsborough Union Hospital (closed c. 1987), did a painting of the main street of the town entitled "40 Below Zero" that won a national contest in 1978. The buildings pictured in it are no longer standing and the location on Railway Avenue is now known as Bennett Park.
 Lew Morrison, former NHLer
 Richard Widdifield, Canadian Artist, Born in Gainsborough in 1961
 Dick Southam, former Progressive Conservative Member of Parliament.

Gallery

See also
 List of communities in Saskatchewan
 List of villages in Saskatchewan

References

External links

Villages in Saskatchewan
Argyle No. 1, Saskatchewan
Division No. 1, Saskatchewan